Robert Sandeman may refer to:

Robert Sandeman (theologian) (1718–1771), whose teachings became known as Sandemanianism
Robert Groves Sandeman (1835–1892), Indian officer and administrator